Jochem Hoekstra (born 21 October 1992) is a Dutch racing cyclist, who last rode for Dutch amateur team NWV Groningen. He rode at the 2013 UCI Road World Championships.

Major results

2013
 5th Overall Tour de Berlin
2014
 1st Overall Tour de Berlin
1st Stage 2 (ITT)
 2nd Grand Prix des Marbriers
 5th Overall Carpathian Couriers Race
1st Stage 2
 9th Overall Dookoła Mazowsza
2015
 Olympia's Tour
1st  Mountains classification
1st Stage 1a (TTT)
 6th Overall Tour du Loir-et-Cher
 7th Overall Czech Cycling Tour
2016
 10th Velothon Wales

References

External links
 

1992 births
Living people
Dutch male cyclists
People from Haren, Groningen
Cyclists from Groningen (province)
21st-century Dutch people